The Reich Chancellery meeting of 12 December 1941 was an encounter between Adolf Hitler and the highest-ranking officials of the Nazi Party. Almost all important party leaders were present to hear Hitler declare the ongoing destruction of the Jewish race, which culminated in the Holocaust. The meeting is less known than the later Wannsee Conference.

Background
The announcement Hitler made on 12 December to the Reichsleiter and Gauleiter refers to an earlier statement he had made on 30 January 1939:

With the entry of the United States into World War II on 7 December 1941 and the declaration of war on the US by Nazi Germany on 11 December, the war, especially in regard to the above statement, had become truly a World War. Hitler announced this declaration of war on 11 December in the German Reichstag, a speech also broadcast on radio. On 12 December 1941, he had a meeting with the most important Nazi leaders.

The meeting
On the afternoon of 12 December, Hitler ordered the leading members of the Nazi Party to a meeting in his private rooms at the Reich Chancellery. Because the meeting took place in private rooms rather than Hitler's office, no official record of it exists. However, entries in the diaries of Joseph Goebbels and Hans Frank confirm it.  Goebbels made the following entry in his diary for 12 December:

Apart from the fact that the European war had turned into a world war, another reason for this shift was the fact that the entry of the United States into the war meant that the Jewish population had lost its value for Hitler as hostages deterring the United States from becoming an active member of the Allied coalition, and he was finally free to act according to his long-term plans. 

Hitler's presence at the Chancellery meeting undermines allegations that he was unaware of the Holocaust and that it was carried out by subordinates without his knowledge.

The meeting marked a turning point in the Nazi regime's attitude towards the Jewish people. It was part of a shift from propaganda, intimidation, and attacks to outright and planned extermination. The latter step had already been taken in some parts of Eastern Europe as early as August 1941. The better-known Wannsee Conference in January 1942 marked the next step in the Nazis' plans to exterminate the Jews.

Attendance
High Nazi party officials were obligated to attend this meeting.  No official attendance list exists, but the following leaders of Nazi Germany, out of the about 50 present, are known to have been there:
 Adolf Hitler
 Heinrich Himmler
 Joseph Goebbels
 Martin Bormann
 Hans Frank
 Philipp Bouhler

In addition, Christian Gerlach writes that it is "virtually certain" that  Alfred Rosenberg; Gauleiters Arthur Greiser, Fritz Bracht, and Fritz Sauckel; Reichskommissars Hinrich Lohse and Erich Koch; and Alfred Meyer were present.

Known to have been absent from this meeting were Hermann Göring and probably Reinhard Heydrich.

References

Sources
  (in German)

Further reading

External links
 Yad Vashem website The Holocaust Martyrs' and Heroes' Remembrance Authority
 Hitler's Genocide Order: 5 Days After Pearl Harbor? The New York Times – article on the German historian Christian Gerlach's research on the Reich Chancellery meeting of 12 December 1941

1941 in Germany
Holocaust historiography
Planning the Holocaust
1940s in Berlin
1941 conferences
Speeches by Adolf Hitler